Julio is a Spanish male given name. It can also be a family name or surname. See Julio (surname).

The equivalent in Portuguese is the accented Júlio.

Acting
Julio Alemán, Mexican actor
Julio Mannino, Mexican actor

Politics
Julio Acosta García, President of Costa Rica from 1920 to 1924
Julio Argentino Roca, army general who served as President of Argentina
Julio María Sanguinetti Coirolo, President of Uruguay
Julio-Claudian Dynasty, the first five Roman Emperors

Sports
Julio Aparicio Díaz, Spanish bullfighter
Julio César Aguirre, Colombian road cyclist
Julio César Blanco, Venezuelan road cyclist
Julio Bonetti (1911–1952), Italian baseball player
Julio Briones, Ecuadorian association footballer
Julio César Chávez, Mexican boxer
Julio Ricardo Cruz, Argentinian association footballer
Julio César Enciso (footballer, born 1974), Paraguayan association footballer
Julio César Enciso (footballer, born 2004), Paraguayan association footballer
Julio César González, light-heavyweight boxer
Julio Franco (born 1958), American baseball player
Julio César Herrera, Venezuelan track and road cyclist
Julio Jones (born 1989), American football player
Julio Lamas, Argentine basketball coach
Júlio Lópes, Brazilian freestyle swimmer
Julio Lugo (1975–2021), Dominican baseball player
Julio César Luña, Venezuelan weightlifter
Julio Mañón (born 1973), Dominican baseball player
Julio César Rangel, Colombian road cyclist
Julio Rodríguez (born 2000), Dominican professional baseball outfielder 
Julio Santana (born 1974), Dominican baseball player
Julio Santos, Ecuadorian freestyle swimmer
Julio César Urías, Guatemalan race walker
Julio Urías (born 1996), Mexican professional baseball player
Julio Valentín González, Paraguayan association footballer
Julio Velasco, Argentine volleyball coach

Other fields
Julio Cortázar, Argentine intellectual and author of several experimental novels and many short stories
Julio Fernández (disambiguation), multiple people
Julio Garavito Armero, Colombian astronomer
Julio Gonzalez (arsonist), unemployed Cuban refugee
Julio González (sculptor), Spanish sculptor
Julio Iglesias, Spanish international singer, father of singer Enrique Iglesias
Julio Preciado, banda singer based in Mazatlán, Sinaloa, Mexico
Julio Macat, Argentinian-born American cinematographer, and the husband of Elizabeth Perkins
Julio Suárez, Guatemalan banker
Julio Franco Arango, Colombian Roman Catholic bishop
Julio Silva, Argentine artist, painter and sculptor living in Paris, France, since 1955

Fictional characters
Julio Lopez, a character in the cartoon "M.A.S.K. (TV series)"

References

Spanish masculine given names